Çanta Wind Farm is a 2014 wind power plant consisting of 19 wind turbines with a total installed capacity of 47.5 MW. The wind farm is in Çanta in the Silivri district of Istanbul Province, northwestern Turkey.

The wind farm was initially projected by Bora Wind Energy Company in 2011. After Boydak Energy Company took over Bora Co., construction began in 2012. The farm went into production in May 2014 with six turbines, each with a capacity to generate 2.5 MW. By the end of June 2014, eight more turbines were in service, increasing the total installed capacity to 35 MW.

Location
The wind farm is located on a -high hill northwest of Çanta town, just east of the provincial border between Tekirdağ and Istanbul.

Technical details
Maximum power output of each of the 19 turbines supplied by Nordex in Germany is 2.5 MW, and the total annual energy production is about 151 GWh. The turbines of type N100/2500 have  rotor diameter.

See also

 List of wind farms in Turkey

References

External links

Silivri
Wind farms in Turkey
Energy infrastructure completed in 2014
2014 establishments in Turkey
Buildings and structures in Istanbul Province
21st-century architecture in Turkey